Archaraeoncus is a genus of  dwarf spiders that was first described by A. V. Tanasevitch in 1987.

Species
 it contains four species found in Europe and Asia:
Archaraeoncus alticola Tanasevitch, 2008 – Iran
Archaraeoncus hebraeus Tanasevitch, 2011 – Israel
Archaraeoncus prospiciens (Thorell, 1875) (type) – Bulgaria, Ukraine, Russia (Urals), Azerbaijan, China
Archaraeoncus sibiricus Eskov, 1988 – Russia (Middle Siberia to Far East)

See also
 List of Linyphiidae species

References

Araneomorphae genera
Linyphiidae
Spiders of Asia
Spiders of Europe